María Guadalupe Carriles, known as Lupe Carriles, (25 December 1913 – 6 February 1964) was a Mexican character actress.

Career
One of her many memorable roles is as "La Trompeta" in La cucaracha (1959), starring María Félix. Although she acted in more than 159 films, she often portrayed servants.

Selected filmography

The Woman of the Port (1949)
The Doorman (1950)
The Two Orphans (1950)
Women's Prison (1951)
They Say I'm a Communist (1951)
Girls in Uniform (1951)
The Unknown Mariachi (1953)
Made for Each Other (1953)
El Bruto (1953)
Your Memory and Me (1953)
A Tailored Gentleman (1954) 
The Beast of Hollow Mountain (1956)
Puss Without Boots (1957)
Se los chupó la bruja (1958)
The Soldiers of Pancho Villa (1959)
Young People (1961)
El tejedor de milagros (1962)
The Bloody Vampire (1962)
El rey del tomate (1963)

References

External links

1964 deaths
Actresses from Guadalajara, Jalisco
20th-century Mexican actresses
1913 births
Mexican film actresses